Bloody Crayons is a 2017 Philippine suspense thriller film based on the book of the same name by Wattpad writer Josh Argonza. Directed by Topel Lee, the film features an ensemble cast including Janella Salvador, Jane Oineza, Maris Racal, Ronnie Alonte, Sofia Andres, Diego Loyzaga, Yves Flores, Empoy Marquez, and Elmo Magalona.

Development began in April 2015 when Star Cinema picked up the film rights of the book, originally billed by Jane Oineza, Joshua Garcia and Manolo Pedrosa. It was announced to be released in 2016 but undergone numerous recasting as well as the departure of the film's initial director Quark Henares, and production was pushed back beyond the said release date. A final cast was teased on the social media site Twitter late December 2016 but a change was again made early February 2017 replacing Julia Barretto and Joshua Garcia, with Janella Salvador and Elmo Magalona. Production has pushed through and was released on July 12, 2017.

Plot

Nine graduating students head to an island across the sea to finish their final project at school. They include Eunice, a timid and soft-spoken young woman; Olivia, Eunice's best friend; Kenly, Olivia's boyfriend with whom she is in a cool-off mode; Justin, Kenly's best friend who is exuberant and outspoken; Party-girl and very girly Richalaine; Marie, whose attributes are prim and classy; Gerard, the class clown also the eldest of the group; Kiko, who is the photographer and has admiration for Eunice; and John, a newcomer student who also harbors romantic feelings for Eunice. They all head out to Olivia's parents' summer home in an island to shoot a short film. On the island they meet Mang Pedring, a caretaker who instantly causes the group to feel uneasy. Olivia notices Kenly's cold nature towards her, causing her to think he has found someone new. She discovers that Kenly has been dating Marie all along, much to her dismay. To top it all off, Eunice has known the entire time and chose to remain oblivious, thinking she is protecting her friend. A fight ensues on both parties.

The next morning, when their shooting commences, Olivia forgives her friends. Soon, a storm starts, prompting the group to stop shooting. That night, the friends decide to play a game of "Bloody Crayons," a form of "truth or dare?" with a twist. Everyone is instructed to form a circle around a box that has four sets of five crayons—black, white, pink, blue and red. Each color represents a consequence, and each player will draw one crayon at a time. Black represents a rule to be given by the drawer. This rule is to be followed during the course of the game until the next black crayon is drawn. Failure to follow the rule means the drawer will vandalize the face of the violator. White represents immunity of the drawer from the rule until the next white crayon is drawn. Pink crayons represent friendship and whoever draws a pink crayon will choose a friend and have them make the drawer perform a dare. Blue crayons represent honesty. The drawer will confess something they have not done. If the other friends have done the confession, they have to vandalize their own faces. The drawer can also write on the face of someone they know has done the confession. Lastly, red is considered the bloody crayon, the most exciting piece in the game. The three people to draw the first three red crayons will be given the chance to each put a substance of their choosing in a cup and the last person to draw the red crayon will unfortunately drink the mixture. The game is over when the last red crayon is drawn.

The game commences and everything takes a turn. But the game heated up when Olivia draws the blue crayon and confesses that Olivia slept with Kenly last week regarding Kenly's and Marie's relationship roots up again. The anger causes Marie to draw the last red crayon, prompting her to drink the concoction the other friends have made. Marie vomits after ingesting the liquid. The group panics and gives Marie her water from her personal drinking bottle. She drinks the water, vomits blood and gets killed. Suspicion surrounds Olivia, causing her to run away in fright while a furious Kenly chases after her. The others watch in terror as Olivia had plummeted to her death on a cliff, turning suspicion on Kenly. Getting more violent, Kiko and John bind Kenly to a chair with ropes, much to the others' disagreement. As the group begins to blame one another, a bothered Richalaine goes out of the room only to be seen by Mang Pedring peering over the corpse of Marie. Mang Pedring locks the doors of the house, alarming Richalaine and trapping everyone in. Suspicion soon falls on Mang Pedring. While the others find exits and weapons, Eunice convinces Kiko to free Kenly.

On the other room, Kenly attempts to free himself. When Kiko goes to check on him, they find him dead with his throat slashed. An angered Justin (who found a gun lying around the house earlier) threatens to kill them, insisting one of the remaining friends killed Kenly. John fights with Justin, after Kiko gets knocked out. Kiko then regains consciousness and tries to grab the gun from Justin while the others run away from the scuffle except for Gerard. This results into Gerard being accidentally shot in the stomach. Richalaine steals the gun from Justin while being chased by the latter and hides in an upstairs bedroom. Justin chases Richalaine, steals the gun back from her and threatens to kill her, blaming her for Kenly's death. Justin slips in Richalaine's defense and knocks his head on a sink, rendering him unconscious. Eunice goes back for her remaining friends as John runs off into the woods.

Kiko attempts to aid Gerard but is weakened by his gunshot wound. Gerald eventually dies. Eunice and Richalaine get reunited only to be chased by a figure dressed in one of their filmmaking costumes. The pair are able to lure their attacker away only to be cornered by a now deranged Justin who has a butcher's knife and still full of vengeance. Justin tries to kill the both of them but Richalaine attempts to fend him off only for them to fall down a flight of stairs, killing the two instantly. Eunice eventually sees Justin and Richalaine's dead body and mourns as she gets reunited with Kiko. The two are greeted at the door by John who claims to have found a speed boat. Kiko grows suspicious, wondering how John was able to open the door with Mang Pedring's own set of keys. John explains Mang Pedring got killed by one of his animal traps but Kiko, still doubtful, attempts to fight him only for John to fall on a hidden pit. John survives the fall because of a ladder and follows the pit instead. John notices that the pit leads to the same exact location where Olivia was killed but her body was nowhere to be found.

As the pair arrive at the shore, they see a speedboat, indicating John was truthful all along. Suddenly, Olivia's voice emanates from Eunice's walkie-talkie, begging for help. Eunice and Kiko go back in the house only to find an unscathed Olivia. Kiko's suspicions are transferred to Olivia because of her survival from the fall without even suffering any bruises or major injuries, he attempts to warn Eunice only to be stabbed in the back with a knife, revealing Olivia was the perpetrator all along. Olivia chases Eunice around the house with a hunting rifle. John arrives to the rescue but ends up getting shot by Olivia, seemingly killing him. Olivia then chases Eunice into the woods. During the chase, Eunice discovers Mang Pedring’s body impaled to one of his animal traps. Eunice and Olivia eventually ends up on the same cliff where they thought Kenly pushed Olivia at the beginning of the movie. Olivia explains that she only intended to kill Kenly, Marie and her but claims innocence on the death of the others. Olivia said that it wasn’t her fault that their friends decided to kill each other. She also claims that Mang Pedring’s death was because of his own stupidity by not knowing his own traps. A fight ensues between Eunice and Olivia. With Olivia gaining upper hand, she was ready to kill Eunice. Suddenly, a drone controlled by John flies towards them which knocks Olivia and leaves her dangling from the cliff. Eunice grabs her hand in time. Realizing what she had done, a helpless Olivia dangles and apologizes to Eunice before falling to her death.

John, who survived the shot because of his dead brother’s dog tag, runs to help Eunice. Kiko’s weak voice suddenly emits from the walkie-talkie. Eunice, John and an injured Kiko, ride a boat on the way home.

Cast

 Janella Salvador as Eunice Nicolas
 Elmo Magalona as Kiko Rivera
 Jane Oineza as Olivia "Liv" Mendez
 Empoy Marquez as Gerard Anderson
 Nanding Josef as Pedring
 Maris Racal as Richalaine "Rich" Alcantara
 Sofia Andres as Marie Ragma
 Diego Loyzaga as Kenly Sy
 Ronnie Alonte as John Jose Abrillo
 Yves Flores as Justin Ybanez
 Marc Abaya as Paolo Abrillo
 Sarah Abad as Benilda
 Lance Lucido as young Kiko Rivera

Production
Development began in April 2015, when Star Cinema picked up the film rights of the book. Not long after Jane Oineza, Manolo Pedrosa and Joshua Garcia were announced to be starring in the film adaptation. Quark Henares was hired to direct the film along with Earl Ignacio as assistant director. Quark Henares has been working on the script for the movie for almost a year before the announcement of his involvement with the project. On February 12, 2016, a final cast was revealed during the script reading for the film which was attended by Julia Barretto, Maris Racal, Jane Oineza, Sofia Andres, Yves Flores, Diego Loyzaga, and Khalil Ramos. Joshua Garcia and Manolo Pedrosa has been dropped by this point. February 22, 2016, the cast had a look test for the film where they were joined by additional cast members Bailey May and Ylona Garcia. Iñigo Pascual announced via Twitter that he would also be joining the cast.

Production stopped after the departure of the director and no further news was announced. On December 21, 2016, a picture circulated on the social media site Twitter. It was the cast for the film with the exclusion of some, and the return of Joshua Garcia to the roster as well as the addition of Empoy Marquez and Ronnie Alonte. In February 2017 a new batch of photos were posted on Twitter. It was a look test for the film with Julia Barreto and Joshua Garcia replaced by Janella Salvador and Elmo Magalona.

Filming
On April 6, 2016, First day of filming for the movie started with the whole cast set-up on one of their locations. Some of the cast members also tweeted about their excitement for the first day of filming. Not soon after, the director, Quark Henares announced via Twitter that he has left the project. This eventually stopped the whole production and no further updates were announced. After being pushed back and other production and filming delays, principal photography for the film officially began on March 2, 2017.

Reception
Milliscent Ong of ABS-CBN News praised the film's humor and performances of the ensemble cast, concluding that it is "ideal for those who are fond of watching movies related to psychological thriller, mystery and murder". Rappler's Oggs Cruz was lenient in his review; while he found the film's setup to be "admittedly a drag", he also said that "it is also the type of bad movie that is so committed to all its ludicrous and absurd elements that it becomes so wildly entertaining. (...) Bloody Crayons is a film so bad, it's good".  Wanggo Gallaga of InterAksyon said that "Jane Oineza, who plays Olivia, the friend who owns the resthouse and who is pining for her ex, was one of the few who managed to push through from the uneven storytelling. Her character had the most demands and she didn’t buckle under that pressure and even delivered moments of brilliance."

See also
 And Then There Were None
 Whodunnit

References

External links
 

2017 films
Filipino-language films
Philippine thriller films
Star Cinema films
Philippine slasher films
Films directed by Topel Lee